Sergi Barjuán Esclusa (born 28 December 1971), known simply as Sergi as a player, is a Spanish former professional footballer who played as a left-back, currently a manager.

Best known for his Barcelona stint, he played for the first team for nine seasons and made a major contribution to the winning of nine major titles. Having reached the Spain national team shortly after making his professional club debut, he appeared in two World Cups and as many European Championships.

In 2009, Barjuán embarked on a managerial career, leading Recreativo, Almería and Mallorca. He also had brief La Liga spells at the second of those clubs, and in interim charge of Barcelona.

Playing career

Club
Born in Les Franqueses del Vallès, Barcelona, Catalonia, Sergi was a youth product of giants FC Barcelona. He had not yet appeared in La Liga when he was summoned by first-team manager Johan Cruyff to a UEFA Champions League group stage game away against Galatasaray S.K. (0–0, on 24 November 1993), and from then on became the side's undisputed first choice, never playing less than 31 matches until 1999; with Barça he won three leagues, two cups and two supercups, adding the 1997 edition of the UEFA Cup Winners' Cup and the subsequent UEFA Super Cup, partnered in the other defensive wing by another youth graduate, Albert Ferrer.

After being deemed surplus to requirements by coach Louis van Gaal, Sergi joined Atlético Madrid, where he still posted three respectable seasons although he collected a total of 33 yellow cards.

International
Shortly after having been promoted into Barcelona's main squad, Sergi made his debut for Spain on 9 February 1994, in a friendly with Poland in Santa Cruz de Tenerife in which he scored his only international goal. He went on to represent the nation at the 1994 FIFA World Cup, UEFA Euro 1996, the 1998 World Cup and Euro 2000, for a total of 56 caps.

Coaching career

Barcelona (youth)
In July 2009, after several years working in marketing and running football camps for youngsters, Barjuán returned to Barcelona, being named its Juvenil B manager. During his spell he coached Gerard Deulofeu, Patric and Rafinha, whom eventually starred for the senior team.

Recreativo
Barjuán was handed his first job in the professionals on 22 May 2012, signing for three years with Recreativo de Huelva in the Segunda División. On his debut on 18 August, he lost 2–0 at Xerez CD.

In his second year at El Decano, Barjuán missed out on a play-off place on the final day. He then cancelled his contract in June 2014 and was replaced by José Luis Oltra.

Almería
Barjuán was appointed manager of UD Almería on 6 April 2015, taking over from Juan Ignacio Martínez who had been fired. His first game in charge occurred two days later, a 4–0 away loss to former club Barcelona.

On 3 October 2015, with the Andalusians back in the second tier, Barjuán was dismissed after a 2–2 home draw against CD Tenerife.

Mallorca
Barjuán resumed his career in April 2017, at RCD Mallorca. He left when his contract expired at the end of the season, with the Balearic side relegated to Segunda División B for the first time in 36 years.

Zhejiang Greentown
On 26 November 2017, the 45-year-old Barjuán moved abroad for the first time in his career, taking the helm at China League One club Zhejiang Greentown F.C. for the next two seasons. He lost his job on 4 July 2019 after a run of two wins from ten left the team in sixth place.

Barcelona B
In June 2021, Barjuán was appointed at FC Barcelona Atlètic on a two-year deal, replacing Francisco Javier García Pimienta. On 28 October, after the dismissal of Ronald Koeman, he was put in interim charge of the main squad. Two days later, on his debut, he oversaw a 1–1 home draw with Deportivo Alavés. In his second game, he won 1–0 at FC Dynamo Kyiv in the Champions League group stage.

Career statistics

Club
Source:

International
Source:

|}

Managerial statistics

Honours
Barcelona
La Liga: 1993–94, 1997–98, 1998–99
Copa del Rey: 1996–97, 1997–98
Supercopa de España: 1994, 1996
UEFA Cup Winners' Cup: 1996–97
UEFA Super Cup: 1997

Spain U21
UEFA European Under-21 Championship third place: 1994

References

External links

1971 births
Living people
People from Vallès Oriental
Sportspeople from the Province of Barcelona
Spanish footballers
Footballers from Catalonia
Association football defenders
La Liga players
Segunda División players
Tercera División players
FC Barcelona C players
FC Barcelona Atlètic players
FC Barcelona players
Atlético Madrid footballers
Spain youth international footballers
Spain under-21 international footballers
Spain international footballers
1994 FIFA World Cup players
UEFA Euro 1996 players
1998 FIFA World Cup players
UEFA Euro 2000 players
Catalonia international footballers
Spanish football managers
La Liga managers
Segunda División managers
Primera Federación managers
Recreativo de Huelva managers
UD Almería managers
RCD Mallorca managers
FC Barcelona Atlètic managers
FC Barcelona managers
China League One managers
Zhejiang Professional F.C. managers
Spanish expatriate football managers
Expatriate football managers in China
Spanish expatriate sportspeople in China